Eurythenes gryllus is a relatively large species of amphipod found worldwide in cold, deep oceans.

It is a predator and scavenger that is fast-swimming and has a highly developed long-range chemoreceptive tracking ability, allowing large numbers to rapidly congregate at carcasses that reach the bottom.

Description and taxonomy
It was first described in 1822 by M. W. Mandt as Gammarus gryllus.

Those of relatively shallow waters only reach about half the length of those found at the largest depths. There are also other morphological differences and genetic studies have revealed several distinct splits, both geographic and depending on depth.

References

Eurythenes
Crustaceans described in 1822